This is a list of ski areas and resorts in Europe and Eurasia.

Albania
 Dardhë
 Pukë

Andorra

Armenia
 Tsakhkadzor Ski Resort
 Jermuk
 Ashotsk
 Lernanist

Austria

Carinthia

Lower Austria

Salzburg

Styria

Tyrol

Upper Austria

Vienna
Hohe-Wand-Wiese

Vorarlberg
Ski Arlberg (Lech, Zürs, Warth, Schröcken, Stuben am Arlberg)
Brandnertal
Bregenzerwald: Damüls-Mellau Ski Area
Kleinwalsertal
Silvretta Montafon
Schruns–Tschagguns

Azerbaijan
 Qabala - Tufandag Mountain Resort
 Qusar - Shahdag Mountain Resort

Belarus
 Raǔbičy
 Silichy

Belgium
 High Fens
 Baraque de Fraiture
 Ovifat

Bosnia and Herzegovina

Bulgaria

Croatia
 Bjelolasica
 Medvednica
 Platak

Cyprus
Mount Olympus

Czech Republic
Churáňov, Šumava
Harrachov
Pec pod Sněžkou
Špindlerův Mlýn

Denmark
 Gjern

Estonia
 Otepää
 Võru
 Kiviõli
 Viimsi

Finland

France

French Alps
Alpes-de-Haute-Provence (04)

Hautes-Alpes (05)

Alpes-Maritimes (06)

Drôme (26)

Isère (38)

Savoie (73)

Haute-Savoie (74)

Vaucluse (84)
Chalet Reynard: 2 ski lifts
Mont Serein: 9 ski lifts, 15 ski slopes (12 km), 7 km of cross-country skiing

Clustered resorts

Corsica
Ghisoni: 3 ski lifts, 7 ski slopes
Val d'Ese: 3 ski lifts, 4 ski slopes
Vergio: 6 ski lifts, 7 ski slopes

Jura Mountains

Massif Central

Morvan (Burgundy)
Station du Haut-Folin: 40 km of cross-country skiing

Pyrenees

Vosges

Georgia

Germany

Allgäu 
 Garmisch-Partenkirchen
 Oberammergau
 Oberstdorf

Bavarian Forest

State of Bavaria
 Zwiesel

Black Forest

State of Baden-Württemberg

Harz mountains

State of Lower Saxony

Mangfallgebirge

State of Bavaria 
 Sudelfeld

Rothaargebirge

State of North Rhine-Westphalia  
 Winterberg

Sauerland

State of North Rhine-Westphalia
 Willingen

Swabian Jura

State of Baden-Württemberg
 Aalen
 Albstadt-Tailfingen
 Genkingen
 Römerstein
 Westerheim
 Wiesensteig

Greece

Hungary
 Bánkút, in the Bükk mountains 
 Eplény
 Kékes
 Mátraszentimre

Iceland

Italy

Piedmont

Aosta Valley

Lombardy

Trentino

South Tyrol

Veneto

Friuli-Venezia Giulia
Forni di Sopra - Sauris
Passo Pramollo
Piancavallo
Sella Nevea - Canin
Tarvisio
Zoncolan (Ravascletto)

Emilia-Romagna
Cerreto Laghi
Cimone (Sestola, Pievepelago)
Corno alle Scale

Tuscany
Abetone
Amiata
Cutigliano-Doganaccia
Zum Zeri

Marche
Frontone - Monte Catria
Sassotetto
Ussita (Frontignano)

Lazio
Campo Catino
Campo Staffi
Monte Livata
Terminillo

Abruzzo

Molise
Campitello Matese

Campania
Laceno

Basilicata 
Arioso
Sellata

Calabria
Camigliatello Silano
Gambarie

Sicily
Etna (Piano Provenzana, Rifugio Sapienza) 
Piano Battaglia

Sardinia
 Bruncu Spina ski area

Kosovo
 Brezovica ski resort
 Rugova

Latvia

Liechtenstein
 Malbun

Lithuania
 Anykščiai
 Druskininkai
 Ignalina
 Liepkalnis Winter Sports Centre

Montenegro
 Durmitor
 Kolašin
 Vucje

North Macedonia

Norway

Poland

Portugal
 Vodafone Ski Resort, in Serra da Estrela (near Loriga)

Romania

Banat

Bucovina

Crişana

Maramureş

Moldavia

Muntenia

Oltenia

Transilvania

Russia

Caucasus Mountains

Leningrad Oblast

Moscow Oblast
Sorochany

Murmansk Oblast
Kirovsk

Tver Oblast
Panovo

Ural Mountains
Bashkortostan -
Park Pobedy, Ufa, Republic of Bashkortostan
Ak-Yort, Ufa, Republic of Bashkortostan
Olympic Park, Ufa, Republic of Bashkortostan
Abzakovo
Bannoye Lake

Chelyabinsk Oblast -
Adzhigardak
Minyar
Zavyalikha

Perm Krai -
Gubakha

Sverdlovsk Oblast -
Pilnaya

Serbia

Balkan Mountains
 Crni Vrh ski center
 Stara Planina ski center
 Suva Planina ski center

Dinaric Alps
 Brezovica ski center
 Divčibare ski center
 Goč ski center
 Golija ski center
 Kopaonik ski resort
 Iver ski center
 Tara ski center
 Tornik ski center
 Zlatar ski center

Rilo-Rhodope Mountains
 Besna Kobila ski center

Slovakia

Tatra Mountains

Low Tatras

Other mountain ranges

Slovenia

Spain

Pyrenees
From East to West:

Cantabrian Mountains
From East to West:
Lunada
Alto Campoo
San Isidro
Fuentes de Invierno
Valgrande-Pajares
Leitariegos
Manzaneda

Sistema Central
Sierra de Béjar - La Covatilla
Navacerrada
Navafria (only cross-country skiing)
La Pinilla
Puerto de Cotos (cross-country)
Valdesquí

Sistema Ibérico
Aramon Javalambre
La Muela de San Juan (cross-country)
Aramon Valdelinares
Valdezcaray

Baetic System
Sierra Nevada, the southernmost ski resort in Europe
Puerto de La Ragua (only cross-country skiing)

Sweden

Switzerland

Central Switzerland

Eastern Switzerland

Bern

Fribourg

Graubünden

Canton of Jura
 Les Breuleux
 Les Genevez

Neuchâtel
 Bugnenets-Savagnières
 Crêt-du-Puy

Ticino
 Airolo
 Bosco/Gurin
 Carì

Valais

Vaud

Turkey

Ukraine
 Bukovel
 Drahobrat
 Oriavchyk
 Podobovets and Pilipets
 Slavske
 Tisovets

United Kingdom
 Northern England 

 Highlands of Scotland

 Lowlands of Scotland
 Lowther Hills
 Pentland Hills

References 

Europe
Skiing in Europe
Ski
Ski